The 2012 Tequila Patrón American Le Mans Series at Long Beach was held at Long Beach Street Circuit on April 14, 2012. It was the second round of the 2012 American Le Mans Series season.

Qualifying
Due to heavy rain before the qualifying session was scheduled to take place, the ALMS decided to postpone the qualifying session. Grid position was decided by points standings in the championship which meant the No. 16 Dyson Racing car started on pole position.

Qualifying results
Pole position winners in each class are marked in bold.

Race

Race result
Class winners in bold.  Cars failing to complete 70% of their class winner's distance are marked as Not Classified (NC).

See also
2012 Toyota Grand Prix of Long Beach

References

Long Beach
Grand Prix of Long Beach
American Le Mans Series at Long Beach